

Creswell may refer to:

Places

United Kingdom
 Creswell, Derbyshire
 Creswell Crags
 Creswell Model Village
 Creswell, Staffordshire

United States
 Creswell, also called Smyrna, Jefferson County, Indiana
 Creswell Township, Cowley County, Kansas
 Creswell, Kentucky
 Creswell, Maryland
 Creswell, North Carolina
 Creswell, Oregon
 Creswell, Pennsylvania

Elsewhere
 Creswell Bay, Qikiqtaaluk Region, Nunavut, Canada
 Creswell Gardens, Adelaide, Australia

Other
 Creswell (surname)
 Creswell High School (disambiguation)
 HMAS Creswell, a Royal Australian Navy base on the South Coast of New South Wales

See also 
Cresswell (disambiguation)
Carswell